Rotoiti  is a settlement on the shore of Lake Rotoiti, in Rotorua Lakes within the Bay of Plenty Region of New Zealand's North Island.

It is located on State Highway 30, northeast of Rotorua.

The Rotoiti Forest is located south of the settlement.

Demographics
Rotoiti is part of the larger Rotoiti-Rotoehu statistical area.

Rotoiti had a population of 498 at the 2018 New Zealand census, an increase of 87 people (21.2%) since the 2013 census, and an increase of 3 people (0.6%) since the 2006 census. There were 147 households, comprising 255 males and 240 females, giving a sex ratio of 1.06 males per female, with 126 people (25.3%) aged under 15 years, 90 (18.1%) aged 15 to 29, 210 (42.2%) aged 30 to 64, and 72 (14.5%) aged 65 or older.

Ethnicities were 33.1% European/Pākehā, 77.1% Māori, 4.2% Pacific peoples, 1.8% Asian, and 1.8% other ethnicities. People may identify with more than one ethnicity.

Although some people chose not to answer the census's question about religious affiliation, 38.0% had no religion, 44.6% were Christian, 7.8% had Māori religious beliefs, 0.6% were Hindu, 0.6% were Buddhist and 1.8% had other religions.

Of those at least 15 years old, 78 (21.0%) people had a bachelor's or higher degree, and 60 (16.1%) people had no formal qualifications. 42 people (11.3%) earned over $70,000 compared to 17.2% nationally. The employment status of those at least 15 was that 159 (42.7%) people were employed full-time, 63 (16.9%) were part-time, and 36 (9.7%) were unemployed.

Marae

The area has seven marae.

Punawhakareia Marae and Uenuku mai Rarotonga meeting house is a meeting place of the Ngāti Pikiao hapū of Ngāti Te Rangiunuora.

Ruato Marae or Ngā Pūmanawa Marae and Ngā Pūmanawa e Waru meeting house is a meeting place of Ngāti Rongomai.

Tapuaekura a Hatupatu Marae and meeting house is a meeting place of Ngāti Rongomai.

Tapuaeharuru Marae and Uruika meeting house is a meeting place of the Ngāti Pikiao hapū of Ngāti Kawiti and Ngāti Tamateatutahi.

Taurua Marae and Te Rangiunuora meeting house is a meeting place of the Ngāti Pikiao hapū of Ngāti Te Rangiunuora.

Te Waiiti Marae and Hinekura meeting house is a meeting place of Ngāti Rongomai and the Ngāti Pikiao hapū of Ngāti Hinekura.

Waikōhatu Marae and Tarāwhai meeting house is a meeting place of the Ngāti Tarāwhai hapū of Ngāti Rangitakaroro.

In October 2020, the Government committed $4,525,104 from the Provincial Growth Fund to upgrade Taurua Marae and nine others, creating an estimated 34 jobs. It committed $2,984,246 to upgrade Punawhakareia Marae, Ruato Marae, Tapuaekura a Hatupatu Marae, Tapuaeharuru Marae, Te Waiiti Marae and Te Awhe o te Rangi Marae, creating 20 jobs. Another $499,993 was committed to upgrading Waikōhatu Marae, creating 25 jobs.

Education

References

Rotorua Lakes District
Populated places in the Bay of Plenty Region
Populated lakeshore places in New Zealand